Swados is a surname. Notable people with the surname include:

 Elizabeth Swados (1951–2016), American writer, composer, musician, and theatre director
 Harvey Swados (1920–1972), American author
 Robert O. Swados (1919–2012), American attorney and businessman